Tedd Browne  (August 23, 1929 in Estill, South Carolina – July 27, 1968 in Cleveland Heights, Ohio)  was an American singer songwriter.  He was shot and killed while returning from a gig.

Browne graduated from high school in Brooklyn, NY, attended Hastings College in Nebraska, and San Francisco College. He lived in Savannah, Georgia, New York City, NY, Lake George, New York, and Cleveland, Ohio; he served in the US Navy.

Browne appeared on The Tonight Show starring Jack Paar and The Mike Douglas Show.  On January 20, 1965, he sang at President Lyndon B. Johnson’s inaugural ball.  He was married to Inez Browne and had three children.

In 1968 Browne was shot and killed while stopped at a traffic light while returning from a gig at the Cabaret Lounge; Billboard attributed his killing to earlier rioting in Cleveland that week. According to the book Cleveland Heights: Making of an Urban Suburb, "The shooting of black folk singer Tedd Browne in July 1968 at the intersection of Cedar and South Overlook Roads was also racially inspired; his convicted killer had carved an "N" on his bullet for "the first n----- to come up Cedar Hill." (page 126)

Albums
Tedd Browne Sings - LP (Label - Jubilee Records, Catalog # JLP-1031) - 1957
Tedd Browne Sings - LP (Label - National Recording Corporation, Rome, Georgia, Catalog # LPA3) - 1959
Suave Folk Music for Fancy Functions - LP (Label - National Recording Corporation, Rome, Georgia, Catalog # NRC LPA-3 ) - 1958
Savannah Musical Portrait - LP (Label - Capo Records, Cleveland, Ohio - Catalog # MB 343) - 1961
Scarlet Ribbon - LP (Label - Capo Records, Cleveland, Ohio - Catalog # PB-1276 PB-1277) - 196?
Lake George Musical Portrait - LP (Label - Garnet Record Company, Catalog # GR-101) - 1964
Lake George Musical Portrait - CD (Label - Weedgie Music, Schenectady, New York) - 2008
LBJ Musical Portrait - LP (Label - Garnet Record Company, Catalog # GR-102 ) - 1965
LBJ Musical Portrait - CD (Label - Weedgie Music, Schenectady, New York Catalog # 625989565625 ) - 2008
This Little Light of Mine - LP ( Label - Rite Record Productions Inc., Catalog # 22825/6) - 1968

Singles
The Everglades (B-Side - A Corner in Paradise) - 7"/45  (Label - Capitol Records, Catalog # F 4225) - 1959

References

http://www.dailygazette.com/news/2008/jan/20/0120_teddbrowne/?print
https://news.google.com/newspapers?nid=1917&dat=19680729&id=pWktAAAAIBAJ&sjid=HIoFAAAAIBAJ&pg=797,5457405

1929 births
1968 deaths
20th-century American musicians
20th-century American singers
People from Hampton County, South Carolina
Singer-songwriters from South Carolina